The Rising: Antichrist is Born/Before They Were Left Behind is the thirteenth novel in the Left Behind series and the first prequel. It was written by Tim LaHaye and Jerry B. Jenkins and published on Thursday, March 31, 2005. The hardback edition has the title and subtitle as The Rising: Before They Were Left Behind. It takes place 32–9 years before the Rapture.

Plot introduction
The Rising is Prequel 1 of 3 in the books leading up to the events mentioned in Left Behind itself. It focuses 32 years before the main Left Behind series starts.

Marilena Carpathia has only one dream: to be a mother. So when a mysterious clairvoyant promises the fulfillment of this dream, Marilena does not hesitate. Through genetic engineering and the power of the Prince of Darkness himself, Marilena is about to become a chosen vessel, an exact contrary to the Virgin Mary, one who will unknowingly give birth to the greatest evil the world has ever known.

Halfway around the world, God's plans are subtly being carried out too. Young Ray Steele is determined to avoid one day taking over the family business. Instead, Ray sets his heart on becoming a pilot.

Soon Carpathia and Steele's lives will intersect. And good and evil will clash in an explosion that will shake the world.

Plot summary
The Rising deals with Rayford Steele's childhood and college days, and how he nearly married another woman. A conflict between father and son as Ray decides to become an airline pilot against his father's wishes.

Also featured is the birth of Nicolae Carpathia, who would later rise up in Nicolae as the Antichrist. Marilena is a simple Romanian woman who is overcome by the need to have a baby. Her husband, Sorin, does not love his wife anymore and is revealed to be a homosexual. Thus, Marilena reads an ad for a group to find something "Beyond themselves", and meets Viviana Ivinisova, later known as Viv Ivins.

Viviana is a Russian who talks with the spirit world. She is a Luciferian, and says that loyalty to her lord can bring Marilena the baby she wants so badly. However, this baby comes through genetic engineering with the best traits of two sperm mixed into a hybrid sperm, which is fused with the egg. At first, it is unknown who Nicolae's two biological fathers are. (Later, they are found out to be Sorin and his lover.) After giving birth and realizing the amazing talent her son possesses, while showing no concern for her, Marilena discovers Viv's plans for the prodigy child.

Jonathan Stonagal is the financier of Nicolae's education. However, Marilena disagrees with these plans so much that she is finally assassinated; however, Nicolae is the one who plans her death through poisoning. Nicolae has his first taste of fame in a TIME Magazine article at a young age, graduates Secondary School early and graduates University in under 2 years and after learning of his parentage, he orders the deaths of both his fathers. After he becomes a multi-millionaire through Stonagal, Nicolae is taken by a demon to the desert, where he is forced to remain without food or water for forty days. In a contrast to Jesus' temptation, Nicolae falls to all three temptations. After this, Nicolae is returned to Romania.

Meanwhile, Ray Steele deals with his father, who is determined to have Ray take over the family business. Ray has his own dreams of becoming a pilot, and joins ROTC to attend college, where he meets and almost marries Kitty. However, Ray has second thoughts about the latter, and breaks up with her. Furthermore, he later dates his friend Irene, and they get married after a while. Chloe Steele is born during this time as well. After befriending a woman named Jackie, Irene slowly begins to feel something is missing in her life. Jackie, a Christian, lays out God's plan of salvation, and Irene accepts Christ.

Characters
 Rayford Steele
 Nicolae "Nicky", "Nick" Carpathia
 Dr. Sorin Carpathia, dies in this book
 Baduna Marius, dies in this book 
 Dr. Marilena Carpathia
 Viviana Ivinisova
 Reiche Planchette
 Jonathan Stonagal
 Irene Steele
 Hattie Durham
 Raymie Steele
 Chloe Steele
 Robert "Bobby" Stark
 Mr. and Mrs. Stark
 Mr. and Mrs. Steele
 Jackie
 Katherine "Kitty" Wyile
 Fuzzy Belman
 Commander Olson, An officer at ROTC
 Christopher "Chris" Smith
 Earl Halliday
 Janet Allen

Release details
2005, U.S.: Tyndale House, Pub date 31 March 2005, hardback (First edition)
2006, U.S.: Tyndale House, Pub date ? September 2005, paperback

Footnotes

Left Behind series
2005 American novels
Prequel novels
Novels set in Chicago
Novels set in Illinois
Novels set in Israel
Novels set in Romania